Antalya Atatürk Stadium was a multi-purpose stadium in Antalya, Turkey.  It was used mostly for football matches and hosted the home games of Antalyaspor.  The stadium held 12,453.

Gallery

References

External links
Venue information

Football venues in Turkey
Antalyaspor
Multi-purpose stadiums in Turkey
Sports venues in Antalya
Things named after Mustafa Kemal Atatürk